Snake River Conspiracy (SRC) is an American industrial rock band. It was formed in 1996 in the San Francisco Bay Area by producers Eric Valentine and Jason Slater. The band's vocalist, Tobey Torres, was recruited in 1998.

After signing with Reprise Records, Snake River Conspiracy issued their debut album, Sonic Jihad (2000), which received largely positive reviews but experienced little commercial success. Between 2001 and 2006, Snake River Conspiracy attempted to record a second album tentatively titled SRC2, but its conception was stunted by the band's departure from Reprise in early 2002, and numerous interpersonal conflicts during this period led to several changes in band personnel, with Slater remaining the band's sole constant member. The band finally split up in September 2006, with the album remaining unfinished.

Slater revisited Snake River Conspiracy and SRC2 in 2012, and continued to work on the album for the remainder of the decade until his death in December 2020. Tobey Torres and Mitchell Doran revived the band in 2022, and have plans to release new music in 2023.

History

Formation and Sonic Jihad (1996–2000) 
Snake River Conspiracy was founded in 1996 as a project of producer Eric Valentine and Jason Slater, a former member of Third Eye Blind. After forming, the band hired Tobey Torres to be the band's singer. The band was initially signed to Interscope Records in 1998 on the strength of a two-song demo, and shortly after signing to the label Valentine opted out of the band to focus on his music production career. Problems at Interscope led to the band moving to Elektra Records and then Reprise Records. The band's debut EP/single, "Vulcan", was released on October 5, 1999; it received rave reviews from critics, and was named "Single of the Week" by the British music magazine NME. 

SRC's debut album, Sonic Jihad, was released in the United States on July 11, 2000. The band found moderate success in the United States with their cover of "How Soon Is Now?" by The Smiths, which reached a peak of number 15 on the Billboard Dance Club Songs chart and number 38 on the Modern Rock Tracks chart. The single was promoted with an alleged quote from Morrissey praising the song as "Better than the original", although he would later go on to "sardonically" praise the song as such in an April 2001 interview with Mojo magazine. In response to the Mojo article, "How Soon Is Now?" was reissued as a single in the UK by Morpheus Records in July 2001, where it subsequently reached number 83 on the UK Singles Chart. Despite the success of the "How Soon Is Now?" cover, Sonic Jihad was ultimately a commercial failure, and only reached number 36 on the Billboard Heatseeker Albums chart. Slater blamed the album's failure on Reprise's inability to properly promote the album on MTV and radio, but also attributed some of the blame to the album's production and sound.

SRC2 and breakup (2001–2006) 
In early 2001, Tobey Torres and Jason Slater relocated to Los Angeles, and Snake River Conspiracy commenced work on a second studio album, tentatively known as SRC2, at Henson Recording Studios. After an extended period of radio silence, Snake River Conspiracy announced in October 2002 that they had parted ways with Reprise Records earlier that year, owing to low sales of Sonic Jihad. In a series of postings on Snake River Conspiracy's forums from December 2002, Slater stated that SRC2 would be a complete departure from Sonic Jihad, and said he did not want to create "Sonic Jihad 2" because "it would sound dated as fuck" if he did so. He described the album thematically as being about "payback and retribution".

However, progress on the album was marred by interpersonal disputes and line-up changes, including the departure of drummer Bobby Hewitt in March 2003 and Tobey Torres in February 2004, when she was replaced by Martina Axén, formerly the drummer and backup singer of Drain STH. Axén acrimoniously split with Snake River Conspiracy in August 2005, resulting in Tobey Torres re-joining the band in May 2006. On September 4, 2006, Tobey Torres announced via her MySpace page that she had "once again chosen to disassociate myself from Snake River Conspiracy", with guitarist Mitchell Doran announcing his departure via the band's vBulletin forums two days later. Following both of their departures, Snake River Conspiracy broke up, with Jason Slater choosing to focus on his production career instead. Most of SRC’s 2006 line-up (Doran, Ashif Hakik, drummer Matt Lucich and Slater himself) contributed to Queensrÿche's 2006 studio album Operation Mindcrime II, which was produced by Slater.

Resumed progress and Jason Slater's death (2012–2020) 
Jason Slater started working on SRC2 again in 2012 and continued to work on the album throughout the rest of the 2010s. In 2012 Tobey Torres and Mitchell Doran formed a new band called Mojave Phone Booth. In 2017, Slater reconnected with Torres again through Doran. Slater planned to release a new Snake River Conspiracy album sometime in 2014, as well as release a vinyl version of Sonic Jihad with alternate/original mixes and a B-sides compilation titled B-Sides and Bullshit, but due to Slater's health struggles work on these projects slowed. On December 9, 2020, Slater died of liver failure, effectively ending the band.

Second reformation (2022–present) 
In July 2022, Torres and Mitchell Doran launched a new Instagram account for Snake River Conspiracy, announcing that new music from the band will be released in 2023.

In November 2022, Mitchell Doran alleged that Jason Slater had stolen several compositions that were written by other Snake River Conspiracy members during the SRC2 recording sessions, and reused them with other bands he produced.

Band members

Current members
Tobey Torres-Doran – vocals (1998–2004, 2006, 2022–present)
Mitchell J. Doran – guitarist, producer (2005–2006, 2022–present)

Former members
Jason Slater – producer, bass (1996–2006, 2012–2020), guitars (2004–2005) (died 2020)
Eric Valentine – producer, engineer (1996–1999)
Sinead – vocals (1998)
Martina Axén – vocals, drums (2004–2005)
Geoff Tyson – lead guitarist, production (1998–2002)
Rob Patterson – guitarist (touring only; 2000)
Fab Fernandez Hewitt – guitarist (2002–2004)
Eric "Hendrikx" Henderson – guitarist (2003–2004)
China – guitarist (2004)
Leo Larsen – guitarist (2006)
Ivo Ivanov – keyboards (touring only; 2000–2001)
Scott Engelter  – keyboards (2001–2002)
Ashif Hakik – keyboards (2006) (died 2021)
Jay Lane – drums (2000)
Neil Taylor – drums (2000–2002, 2003–2004)
Bobby Hewitt – drums (2002–2003)
Matt Lucich – drums (2006)

Timeline

Discography
Studio albums
 Sonic Jihad (2000)

References

External links 
 Snake River Conspiracy's Discogs page
Snake River Conspiracy Demos at Myspace
Snake River Conspiracy at MySpace
Tobey Torres at MySpace
River Conspiracy at Songmeanings

American industrial rock musical groups
American industrial metal musical groups
American gothic rock groups
Electronica music groups
Electronic music groups from California
Interscope Records artists
Elektra Records artists
Reprise Records artists
Musical groups established in 1996
Musical groups disestablished in 2006
Musical groups reestablished in 2012
Musical groups disestablished in 2020
Musical groups reestablished in 2022